The Archive is the seventh overall and first promotional EP by American rock band Imagine Dragons, released for a limited time on February 12, 2013 on the United States iTunes Store through KIDinaKORNER and Interscope. The EP was released as a forerunner EP to sell tracks from the then-upcoming deluxe edition of the band's debut studio album Night Visions before it was released in the United States.

Track listing

Charts

Weekly charts

Release history

References

External links
 Imagine Dragons Official site

2013 EPs
Imagine Dragons EPs
Albums produced by Alex da Kid
Interscope Records EPs
Kidinakorner albums